The 597th Bombardment Squadron is an inactive United States Air Force unit.  It was activated at MacDill Field, Florida in April 1943.  After training in the United States, it transferred to the European Theater of Operations, where it was a component of IX Bomber Command.  The squadron served in combat from April 1944 until the end of World War II, earning a Distinguished Unit Citation for an attack on Ediger-Eller, Germany, in December 1944 during the Battle of the Bulge.  Following V-E Day the squadron remained in France until December 1945, when it returned to the United States and was inactivated at Camp Shanks in January 1946.

History
The squadron was established at MacDill Field, Florida in April 1943 as one of the original squadrons of the 397th Bombardment Group, a B-26 Marauder medium bomber group. It drew its initial cadre from the 21st Bombardment Group. The squadron trained under Third Air Force at stations in the southeastern United States. After completing its training by participating in the Tennessee Maneuvers, the squadron departed Hunter Field, Georgia for the European Theater of Operations on 14 March 1944.

The squadron was temporarily stationed at RAF Gosfield upon its arrival in England in early April 1944.  On the 15th of the month, its parent group displaced the 363d Fighter Group at RAF Rivenhall and flew its first combat mission five days later. In preparation for Operation Overlord, the invasion of Normandy, the squadron attacked V-1 flying bomb launch pads, bridges, coastal defenses, marshalling yards and airfields in northern France.  On D-Day the squadron attacked strong points and bombed fuel dumps and other objectives to support ground forces throughout the Normandy Campaign.

In July 1944, the squadron attacked German forces near St Lo, France, during the Allied breakout there.  In August, the squadron moved from England to Gorges Airfield, an Advanced Landing Ground in France.  From there it attacked naval targets at Saint Malo and Brest.  Once on the Continent, the squadron made frequent moves forward as the Allied forces advanced during the Northern France Campaign. By September the squadron began flying missions into Germany, attacking depots and defended areas.

During the Battle of the Bulge, the squadron struck enemy lines of communications.  On 23 December 1944 the unit severed a railway bridge at Ediger-Eller, Germany, despite heavy flak and fighter opposition from the Luftwaffe.  For this action it was awarded a Distinguished Unit Citation.  The squadron continued to fly missions to support the Allied drive into Germany until 20 April 1945, exactly one year after its first combat mission, having completed 239 combat missions.

After V-E Day the squadron returned to its former base at Peronne Airfield, France, and remained there until December, when it returned to the United States.  Upon arrival at Camp Shanks, New York in early January 1946, the squadron was inactivated.

Lineage
 Constituted as the 597th Bombardment Squadron (Medium) on 20 March 1943
 Activated on 20 April 1943
 Redesignated 597th Bombardment Squadron, Medium c. April 1944
 Inactivated on 5 January 1946

Assignments
 397th Bombardment Group, 20 April 1943 – 5 January 1946

Stations

 MacDill Field, Florida, 20 April 1943
 Avon Park Army Air Field, Florida, 14 October 1943
 Hunter Field, Georgia, 2 November 1943 – 14 March 1944
 RAF Gosfield (Station 154), England, 5 April 1944
 RAF Rivenhall (Station 168), England, 15 April 1944
 RAF Hurn (AAF-492), England, 5 August 1944
 Gorges Airfield (A-26), France, 31 August 1944
 Dreux/Vernouillet Airfield (A-41), France, c. 15 September 1944
 Peronne Airfield (A-72), France, c. 7 October 1944
 Venlo Airfield (Y-55), Netherlands, 25 April 1945
 Peronne Airfield (A-72), France, 30 May – c. December 1945
 Camp Shanks, New York, 4–5 January 1946

Aircraft
 B-26 Marauder, 1943–1945

Awards and campaigns

See also
 List of Martin B-26 Marauder operators

References

Notes

Citations

Bibliography

 
 
 
 
 

Bombardment squadrons of the United States Army Air Forces
Military units and formations established in 1943